Al-Madina Sports Cultural & Social Club known as Al-Madina Club or simply Al-Madina is a Libyan football and basketball club based in Tripoli, Libya.

Honours
Libyan Premier League: 3
1976, 1983, 2001

Champion of Tripoli Province: 3
1959, 1960, 1976

Libyan Cup: 3
1977, 1987, 1990
Finalist: 2008, 2010

Libyan Super Cup: 1
2001

Performance in CAF competitions
CAF Champions League: 1 appearance
2002 – Second Round

 African Cup of Champions Clubs: 2 appearances
1977: Second Round
1984: First Round

CAF Cup Winners' Cup: 3 appearances
1978 – First Round
1988 – withdrew in First Round
1991 – Second Round

Current squad

External links 

Official Site

Madina
Association football clubs established in 1953
Sport in Tripoli, Libya
1953 establishments in Libya